Czyste is part of the Wola district of Warsaw.

Czyste may also refer to the following villages:
Czyste, Kuyavian-Pomeranian Voivodeship (north-central Poland)
Czyste, Masovian Voivodeship (east-central Poland)
Czyste, Greater Poland Voivodeship (west-central Poland)
Czyste, Lubusz Voivodeship (west Poland)
Czyste, West Pomeranian Voivodeship (north-west Poland)